Santo Domingo Canton may refer to:
 Santo Domingo (canton), Costa Rica
 Santo Domingo Canton (Ecuador)

Canton name disambiguation pages